Jeffrey Martin Landry (born December 23, 1970) is an American lawyer and politician serving as the Attorney General of Louisiana. He defeated Republican incumbent Buddy Caldwell in a runoff election held on November 21, 2015, and took office on January 11, 2016.

Background
Landry is a Roman Catholic. His mother is a religion school teacher at Trinity Catholic School in St. Martinville in St. Martin Parish. His father is an architect and businessman. He has a brother, Nicholas, who is openly gay and has criticized his politics.

Landry received a Bachelor of Science from the University of Louisiana at Lafayette in environmental and sustainable resources, with a minor in biology. He earned a Juris Doctor degree from Loyola University New Orleans College of Law.

He served at Fort Hood near Killeen, Texas, during Operation Desert Storm. After eleven years in the Louisiana National Guard, he was discharged at the rank of sergeant.

Pre-political career
Landry is a former St. Martin Parish sheriff's deputy and a former police officer in Parks, Louisiana. During his time as a St. Martin Parish deputy, Landry shared a rental home in St. Martinville with a friend and fellow deputy, a man who smuggled at least $10,000 worth of cocaine and stashed it underneath their home. Once his colleagues caught onto the crime, the police executed a search warrant, which Landry signed. The home was searched, and his roommate lost his job and subsequently went to prison. Landry turned in his own badge but remained on as a reserve deputy until 2004.

Until his election as attorney general, he was an attorney and small businessman based in New Iberia.

2007 state senate election
In the 2007 general election, he ran for Louisiana's 22nd Senate District when incumbent Republican State Senator Craig Romero was term-limited. In the general election, he faced Democrat Troy Hebert of Jeanerette in Iberia Parish. Hebert later declared himself an Independent. Hebert defeated Landry by 51% to 49%. At the time the district had a 3 to 1 Democratic majority.

U.S. House of Representatives

Elections
2010

A lifelong Republican, Landry entered the race to represent Louisiana's 3rd Congressional District after Democratic incumbent Charlie Melancon relinquished the seat to make an unsuccessful run for the Senate against David Vitter. Landry won his party's nomination in a runoff election held on October 2, 2010, defeating former Speaker of the Louisiana House of Representatives Hunt Downer of Houma, Louisiana, 19,657 votes to 10,549 votes (65–35 percent).

Landry participated in 2010 in Louisiana Tea Party movement rallies and won that organization's endorsement. The 3rd District voted 61–37 for U.S. Senator John McCain of Arizona in the 2008 presidential election. The Tea Party ran a "Down with Downer" campaign and referred to him as a Democrat (Downer had been a Democrat until 2001).

Landry nearly won the GOP nomination outright in the August 28 closed primary, but he fell 0.9% short of the 50 percent plus one-vote threshold required for nomination in Louisiana. Therefore, he and Downer entered the runoff contest. In the runoff, Landry won 79% in his own Iberia Parish, while Downer was held to 61% in Terrebonne Parish. Landry polled more than 70% in the runoff in St. Mary, St. Martin, St. John the Baptist, St. Charles, and St. James parishes.

Landry soundly defeated his Democratic opponent, Ravi Kishan Sangisetty, an attorney from Houma, 108,957 votes (64%) to 61,909 (36%). He won all but two smaller parishes in the district, St. James and St. John the Baptist. He won Sangisetty's own Terrebonne Parish. He became the second freshman Republican to represent the 3rd District since Reconstruction. Landry said that Sangisetty's "choice of party affiliation and alliance with his Speaker Nancy Pelosi proves he supports the Washington Democrats' liberal agenda of increased taxes, government takeovers of private industry and dramatically liberal values."

2012

Louisiana lost a congressional district due to out-migration during Hurricanes Katrina and Rita. Landry's district was dismantled, and its territory split among three neighboring districts. Landry was drawn into the same district as fellow Republican Charles Boustany of the neighboring 7th District. The new district retained Landry's district number—the 3rd—but geographically and demographically was more Boustany's district; Landry only retained the western third of his old district.

Landry was endorsed by Citizens United. Landry led Boustany in third-quarter 2011 fundraising, $251,000 to $218,000. According to Federal Election Commission, Boustany led in cash-on-hand lead, $1.1 million–$402,000. Landry carried the endorsement of Phyllis Schlafly's Eagle Forum political action committee.

In the November 6 election, Landry trailed Boustany by 45,596 votes. Boustany led the five-candidate field with 139,123 votes (44.7 percent); Landry received 93,527 votes (30 percent). The Democrat Ron Richard procured 67,070 votes (21.5 percent), 7,908 votes (2.5 percent) and 3,765 votes (1.2 percent) were cast, respectively, for Republican Bryan Barrilleaux and the Libertarian Jim Stark. Because none of the five candidates received a majority, Boustany and Landry went into a runoff contest held on December 8.

With 58,820 votes (60.9 percent), Boustany defeated Landry, who polled 37,764 ballots (39.1 percent). Landry prevailed in only three of the ten parishes in the revised district, all of which he then represented, including his home parish of St. Martin, his residence of Iberia, and St. Mary Parish.

Tenure
During his tenure in Congress, Landry was known as an advocate for the Oil and Natural Gas industry. He has heavily criticized President Obama saying, "Republicans continue to criticize the president for being anti-oil. He says that's not true, but his actions don't match his rhetoric."

Landry made national headlines by holding up a sign saying "Drilling=jobs" during Obama's national jobs plan speech in September 2011. Regarding the BP oil spill in the Gulf of Mexico, Landry opposed the liability cap on BP while supporting the Gulf Hurricane Protection Project.

On June 4, 2012, Landry, in a radio program produced by the American Center for Law and Justice, said that the Obama administration was "granting special status or waivers to Muslims as they go through TSA screenings." The Transportation Security Administration does not grant any religious exemptions to Muslims.

In July 2012, Landry made local headlines when he declared his opposition to the establishment of a minor field in lesbian, gay, bisexual, and transgender studies at the University of Louisiana at Lafayette. He wrote to the university's president, Dr. Joe Savoie, saying, "As our nation continues to struggle with high unemployment, higher education's primary mission should be ensuring current and future students have the tools necessary to compete in the 21st century economy." Landry also criticized the new minor as an unnecessary use of taxpayer funding. Savoie refused to drop the course.

In a blog post, Savoie said that the program "did not require budgetary allocations or divert resources from other areas" Savoie also explained, "Our desired posture is to be neither advocate nor adversary on controversial social issues of the day. Rather, our responsibility is to provide in an impartial manner an opportunity for investigation, analysis, and understanding."

Departure
As he departed Washington, D.C., Landry did not rule out a future role in politics.

Attorney General of Louisiana

Election
On February 24, 2014, Landry announced his challenge to Caldwell, who was first elected in 2007 as a Democrat. On July 28, 2015, the Louisiana Republican Party under chairman Roger F. Villere Jr. formally endorsed Landry. Caldwell said that he would have "welcomed the endorsement, but we weren't counting on it. The state party has never endorsed me before..." Caldwell questioned Landry's qualifications for the position: "It's unnerving to me that the statewide Republican Party would even think about endorsing someone who has never tried a civil or criminal case in court. I'm not sure really what his qualifications are."

On July 27 and 29, 2015, Landry hosted the statewide radio talk show The Moon Griffon Show, while host Moon Griffon was vacationing.

Landry finished second with 347,441 votes (32.7 percent) in the primary held on October 24, 2015. Leading the four-candidate field was the two-term incumbent Republican Buddy Caldwell, with 376,187 votes (35.4 percent). Democrat Geraldine "Geri" Broussard Baloney finished third with 187,332 votes (17.6 percent). Another Democrat, Isaac "Ike" Jackson of Plaquemine in Iberville Parish, finished fourth with 115,037 votes (10.8 percent); a second Republican, Marty Maley came in last with 37,787 votes (3.6 percent).  Landry amassed a strong showing principally in southwestern Louisiana, including his own St. Martin and Iberia parishes as well as Assumption, Lafayette, St. Mary, and Calcasieu. Caldwell carried most parishes in the primary.

In the second round of balloting, held on November 21, 2015, Landry prevailed 610,435 (56.3 percent) to Caldwell's 473,876 (43.7 percent).

The Democratic Party choice in the race, Geri Broussard Baloney, an African-American lawyer from Garyville, endorsed Landry in the runoff contest.  After he assumed office, Landry named Baloney's daughter, Quendi Baloney, to a position in his administration. The Baton Rouge Advocate questioned whether the appointment was made on merit or political consideration. Landry defended his choice by citing the education and experience of Ms. Baloney, a graduate of George Washington University and Loyola University New Orleans College of Law who was formerly employed by the United States Department of Justice. She investigated housing discrimination by Donald Sterling, the owner of the Los Angeles Clippers. Baloney and her colleagues secured a $2.7 million settlement from Sterling.

Tenure

Abortion 
Landry opposes access to abortion, and argued in favor of Louisiana's abortion ban.  He recommended that anyone who disagrees with the policy, without exception for rape or incest or age, should move to another state.

In August 2022, at his guidance, he twice urged the Louisiana State Bond Commission to delay funding for a power station that charges drainage pumps in New Orleans over the City's decriminalization of abortion following the state's near-total ban of abortion in July 2022. In September 2022, the Commission went ahead and approved the funding for New Orleans despite Landry's objections.

Antitrust 
Landry has urged bipartisan cooperation in the realm of antitrust enforcement, and endorsed President Joe Biden's nomination of Jonathan Kanter as Assistant Attorney General for the Antitrust Division.

Common Core
Soon after taking office as attorney general, Landry became embroiled in a public dispute with the newly elected Democratic Governor John Bel Edwards over a lawsuit regarding the Common Core State Standards Initiative, which both political figures have opposed. Edwards said that the state will drop the appeal of a federal lawsuit to block the implementation of Common Core. Edwards declared the lawsuit moot because of new federal legislation, the Every Student Succeeds Act, and a state legislative compromise agreed upon in 2015 in the last year of the Jindal state administration. Landry first replied that he would review the case and could proceed with the appeal to the federal court. Edwards wrote to Landry: "As in any case the client, not the attorney, should ultimately make the decisions on the course of action, and I have decided this case will not proceed." A few days later, Landry announced that after having reviewed the matter he would defer to Edwards and drop the suit.

LGBT issues
Soon Landry was in an even larger dispute with the governor. In September 2016, Landry announced that he would block Edwards' attempt to require that state contracts protect gay and lesbian employees from discrimination based on lifestyle. Edwards then sued Landry over his refusal to approve the contracts. In a press conference, Landry vowed, "I will not cower to executive overreach; rather, I will continue to defend our Constitution and the will of the people." On December 14, 2016, Judge Todd Hernandez of Baton Rouge declared Edwards' order unconstitutional even though Edwards maintains that his directive exempts contractors who are also tied to religious organizations. Landry claims that the Edwards directive would have established a new "protected class" of individuals that does not exist in state law. Already, Landry had successfully blocked dozens of legal services contracts which included the gay-rights language. Landry told radio talk show host Moon Griffon that he hopes his legal victory over the governor will persuade Edwards not to attempt to govern by executive orders to the extent that outgoing U.S. President Barack H. Obama did during much of his eight-year tenure.

In March 2017, however, Edwards announced that he will appeal the LGBT case won by Landry before Judge Hernandez. In a speech in West Monroe before the Ouachita Republican Women, Landry claimed that Edwards is "playing petty politics" by seeking cuts in the attorney general's office budget while state highways "continue to fail." He noted too that U.S. News & World Report declared that Louisiana is "back to being 50th again" and was ranked "the worst state." Landry also noted that Edwards voted for most of the previous budgets of the former Jindal administration yet continues to claim that he is blameless in the state's ongoing budget crisis which Edwards seeks to resolve through greater taxation.

Landry's brother, Nick, who is openly gay, opposes the attorney general on LGBT issues: "I can't remain silent any longer, because although I am not political, I am a human being, and I just want my rights, my unalienable rights. Those of you who are worried, who are in the same position as me and who may not have an attorney general for a brother, I want you to know I stand with you guys and those who want to be married, and I'll do anything I can do to support anyone and any organization."

Local control
Early in 2016, Landry became embroiled in a dispute with Mitch Landrieu, the Democratic mayor of New Orleans, over failed efforts to curtail street crime in New Orleans. Landry named a task force on the issue without consultation with the Louisiana State Police or the New Orleans Police Department. Landry claims that crime in New Orleans is "more dangerous than Chicago." NOPD Superintendent Michael S. Harrison said that Landry had ignored the city home rule charter and does not have the legal authority "to engage in active law enforcement in New Orleans." Landrieu claimed that Landry's task force has placed the lives of state troopers and city police officers in jeopardy.

Budget dispute
In April 2017, Landry again filed suit against Governor John Bel Edwards; this time, he disputes the freezing of $4 million in an escrow fund obtained from a pharmaceutical settlement in 2013, when Buddy Caldwell was the state attorney general. Landry claims that his office is entitled to the funds because it must generate revenues to meet a portion of its own budget. Edwards replied that Landry is fighting budget cuts that have also been imposed on other state offices. "It's another dog and pony show," Edwards said of the suit. Landry called Edwards "an emperor ... a predictable and vindictive Washington-style politician more concerned with political points than the people's business. By playing petty partisan politics, the governor is jeopardizing the operations of the Louisiana Department of Justice." Three months later, Landry withdrew this suit against Edwards which became moot after state Senator Bret Allain of Jeanerette, vice chairman of the Senate Finance Committee, brokered a compromise that transfers $2.7 million to Landry's office operations.

DACA
In July 2017, Texas Attorney General Ken Paxton led a group of Republican Attorneys General from nine other states, including Landry in Louisiana, as well as Idaho Governor Butch Otter, in threatening the Donald Trump administration that they would litigate if the president did not terminate the Deferred Action for Childhood Arrivals policy that had been put into place by President Barack Obama. Tennessee Attorney General Herbert Slatery subsequently reversed his position and withdrew his participation from the proposed suit on August 31. Slatery went further to urge passage of the DREAM Act.

Religious views
In April 2018, Landry joined Republican U.S. Representative Mike Johnson of Louisiana's 4th congressional district and Christian actor Kirk Cameron to argue under the First Amendment for student-led prayer and religious expression in public schools. Landry and Johnson appeared, with Cameron on a promotional video, at prayer rallies at the First Baptist Church of Minden and Bossier Parish Community College in Bossier City. The gatherings were organized by area pastors, including Brad Jurkovich of First Baptist Bossier, in response to a lawsuit filed in February against the Bossier Parish School Board and the superintendent, Scott Smith. The board and the superintendent are accused of permitting teachers to incorporate various aspects of Christianity in their class presentations.

NAAG presidency
In 2018, Landry was elected for a one-year term as president of the National Association of Attorneys General. In 2019, NAAG urged Attorneys General for all 50 U.S. states, the District of Columbia, and all five U.S. territories to support a bill, the Secure and Fair Enforcement (SAFE) Banking Act (H.R. 1595), sponsored by U.S. Rep. Ed Perlmutter (D-Colo.), which would permit marijuana-related businesses in states and territories to use the banking system. The bill would facilitate collection of taxes levied on the $8.3 billion industry, reduce the danger of operating cash-only businesses and more effectively monitor the industry. 17 state AGs opposed the measure.

2020 U.S. presidential election
On December 8, 2020, Texas Attorney General Ken Paxton sued the states of Georgia, Michigan, Wisconsin, and Pennsylvania, where certified results showed Joe Biden the electoral victor over President Donald Trump. Landry joined the lawsuit and an amicus brief filed by the Missouri AG, seeking to overturn the results of the presidential election by challenging election processes in four states where Trump lost. 16 other states' Attorneys General who support Paxton's challenge of the election results alleged numerous instances of unconstitutional actions in the four states' presidential ballot tallies, arguments that had already been rejected in other state and federal courts. In Texas v. Pennsylvania, Paxton asked the United States Supreme Court to invalidate the four states' combined sixty-two electoral votes, allowing Trump to be declared the winner of a second presidential term. On December 11, the U.S. Supreme Court quickly rejected the suit which Landry had joined, in an unsigned opinion.

Opposition to COVID-19 vaccine requirement 
In 2021, Landry sued the federal government for a requirement that health care workers be vaccinated against COVID-19. Landry said the requirement was an "unconstitutional and immoral attack" on health care workers.

Reelection campaign in 2019
In August 2018, Landry indicated that he may forego his planned bid for reelection as attorney general in 2019 and instead challenge Governor John Bel Edwards, who is seeking a second term. Landry said that people everywhere approach him and urge him to seek the governorship. He indicated that he may run unless U.S. Senator John N. Kennedy decides to enter the gubernatorial race and called upon interested Republican candidates to announce their intentions. Landry has broken with Edwards on numerous political issues, including the voter referendum scheduled on November 6, 2018, which requires unanimous jury consent for felony convictions, rather than the current ten of twelve jurors. Only Louisiana and Oregon have the lower threshold.

In November, Landry announced that he would not run for governor but instead seek reelection as attorney general.

Landry is the chairman of the Louisiana Committee for a Conservative Majority, which is targeting "Republicans in Name Only" (RINO) state legislators in the 2019 elections. Landry has stated he wants party faithful to rally around conservative orthodoxy, rather than a big tent.

On October 12, 2019, Landry was overwhelmingly re-elected by a 2-1 margin.

2023 Louisiana gubernatorial election
On October 5, 2022, Landry officially launched his campaign for Governor of Louisiana in the 2023 election.

Personal life
Landry and his wife, the former Sharon LeBlanc, have one son, J. T. Landry (born 2004). While serving in the House of Representatives, Landry kept an apartment in Washington, D.C., while his wife and son resided in his district in Louisiana.

Electoral history

References

External links

 Congressman Jeff Landry official U.S. House website
 Jeff Landry for Congress
 
 
 Jeff Landry profile at FactCheck.org

|-

|-

1970 births
Living people
21st-century American politicians
American police officers
Businesspeople from Louisiana
Louisiana Attorneys General
Louisiana lawyers
Louisiana National Guard personnel
Loyola University New Orleans alumni
People from New Iberia, Louisiana
People from St. Martinville, Louisiana
Republican Party members of the United States House of Representatives from Louisiana
Tea Party movement activists
United States Army soldiers
University of Louisiana at Lafayette alumni